Rhyothemis braganza, known as the Iridescent flutterer, is a species of dragonfly in the family Libellulidae.
The genus Rhyothemis extends from Africa to the western Pacific, with five species known in Australia. Rhyothemis braganza inhabits streams, rivers and riverine pools on, and adjacent to, the coast in Queensland, Northern Territory and northern Western Australia.

Rhyothemis braganza is a medium-sized dragonfly with a wingspan of 60-85mm. On the adult, dark markings on the forewing and hindwing are of similar length and lack pale spots which appear on the similar species Rhyothemis resplendens. The taxon has been assessed for the IUCN Red List as being of least concern.

Gallery

See also
 List of Odonata species of Australia

References

Libellulidae
Odonata of Australia
Endemic fauna of Australia
Taxa named by Ferdinand Karsch
Insects described in 1890